Jeff Van de Graaf (born 1959) is an Australian former swimmer. He competed in two events at the 1976 Summer Olympics.

References

External links
 

1959 births
Living people
Australian male butterfly swimmers
Australian male medley swimmers
Olympic swimmers of Australia
Swimmers at the 1976 Summer Olympics
Place of birth missing (living people)